The San Isidro Nautical Club, is a sailing club located in San Isidro, Buenos Aires.

History
The San Isidro Nautical Club was founded on February 26, 1910. When Che Guevara was a young boy, his parents were members in the club and they regularly took him there to swim at the club's beaches.

Facilities
The club offers a variety of facilities. Their most popular facilities are their docking facilities which members of the club can purchase in order to dock their boat. The club also offers other facilities to its members including clay tennis courts, football, squash courts, volleyball courts, gymnastics facilities, beaches, and an 18-hole golf course.

See also
List of yacht clubs
Yacht club

References

External links
Official website (Spanish)

 
Venues of the 2018 Summer Youth Olympics